Kool Moe Dee is the eponymous debut solo studio album by American rapper Kool Moe Dee from the Treacherous Three. It was released in 1986 via Jive Records, and produced by Teddy Riley, Bryan "Chuck" New, LaVaba Mallison, Pete Q. Harris, Robert Wells and Kool Moe Dee.

The album peaked at number 83 on the Billboard 200, number 20 on the Top R&B/Hip-Hop Albums and sold over 430,000 copies. The record spawned four singles: Go See the Doctor, "Rock Steady", "Dumb Dick (Richard)" and "Do You Know What Time It Is?", but only its lead single, "Go See the Doctor" has reached music charts, peaking at #89 on the Billboard Hot 100 and #82 on the UK Singles Chart. Kool Moe Dee was released on compact disc in 1989.

Track listing

Sample credits
"Rock Steady" contains elements from "Punk Rock Rap" by The Cold Crush Brothers (1983) and "Ball of Confusion (That's What the World Is Today)" by The Temptations (1970)

Personnel
Mohandes Dewese – vocals, producer
Edward Theodore Riley – producer
Bryan Chuck New – producer
LaVaba Mallison – producer
Peter Brian Harris – producer
Robert Wells – producer
Doug Rowell – photography
Kofi Tuda – grooming

Charts

Album

Singles

References

External links

1986 debut albums
Jive Records albums
Kool Moe Dee albums
Albums produced by Teddy Riley